Masir Mahalleh (also Romanized as Masīr Maḩalleh; also known as Masīr Maḩalleh-ye Bālā, Maşīr Maḩalleh-ye Bālā, and Moşber Maḩalleh) is a village in Karipey Rural District, Lalehabad District, Babol County, Mazandaran Province, Iran. At the 2006 census, its population was 233, in 64 families.

References 

Populated places in Babol County